UB1 may refer to:

 UB1, a postcode district in the UB postcode area
 SM UB-1, a German Type UB I submarine active in World War I
 UB1 File format used by Roadhawk in-car video recorder to store video, audio and GPS Data.